This is a list of The Smurfs characters appearing in the original comics series, television shows, Smurfs Bubble Story game and the 2011 movie (as well as its sequels).

The Smurfs were also sold as collectible toys, and many of these characters were ideal from manufacturing and marketing points of view in that they had the same basic body plan but could be differentiated by one or two distinguishing accessories.

Smurfs
According to Spirou magazine N° 1954 from 1964, there are 100 Smurfs in total; this does not take into account later additions from the Smurfs films.

Villains

Supporting

References

External links
 How many Smurfs ? 
 Smurfs Official website
 Smurfs Characters

Lists of characters in American television animation